Alex Molčan was the defending champion but chose not to defend his title.

Leandro Riedi won the title after defeating Tomáš Macháč 6–3, 6–1 in the final.

Seeds

Draw

Finals

Top half

Bottom half

References

External links
Main draw
Qualifying draw

HPP Open - 1